Jamestown Township may refer to:

 Jamestown Township, Steuben County, Indiana
 Jamestown Township, Howard County, Iowa
 Jamestown Charter Township, Michigan
 Jamestown Township, Blue Earth County, Minnesota
 Jamestown Township, Guilford County, North Carolina, in Guilford County, North Carolina

Township name disambiguation pages